Baghlujeh or Baghlujeh or Baghloojeh, also rendered as Bagludzhakh, may refer to various places in Iran:
 Baghlujeh, East Azerbaijan
 Baghlujeh, Qorveh, Kurdistan Province
 Baghlujeh, Saqqez, Kurdistan Province
 Baghlujeh, West Azerbaijan
 Baghlujeh, Zanjan
 Baghlujeh-ye Aqa, Zanjan Province
 Baghlujeh Bayat, Zanjan Province
 Baghlujeh-ye Sardar, Zanjan Province